The 1998 Northern Ireland Assembly election took place on Thursday, 25 June 1998. This was the first election to the new devolved Northern Ireland Assembly. Six members from each of Northern Ireland's eighteen Westminster Parliamentary constituencies were elected by single transferable vote, giving a total of 108 Members of the Legislative Assembly (MLAs).

Results

Details
Although the SDLP won the most first preference votes, the Ulster Unionists won the most seats in the Assembly. This has been attributed  to several reasons, including:

 Slightly different turnouts across the province, with the result that in the more staunchly unionist east fewer votes were required to elect an MLA than in the SDLP's heartlands in the west.
 The Ulster Unionists proved better at "vote balancing" whereby in the rounds of transfers their candidates were less likely to be eliminated earlier on.
 The Ulster Unionists proved better at attracting transfers from other parties (and due to the vote balancing mentioned above, were more likely to be in a position to benefit from this)

See also
 1st Northern Ireland Assembly

References

Manifestos
 It's Time For Tomorrow... Together, Alliance
 Your Best Guarantee for the Future of Northern Ireland, Democratic Unionist Party
 A Fresh Future, Northern Ireland Conservatives
 A New Voice For New Times, Northern Ireland Women's Coalition
 For Real Change – Building a New Ireland, Sinn Féin
 Now, Say Yes To A Future Together, Social Democratic and Labour Party
 Together Within the Union, Ulster Unionist Party
 Manifesto of The Workers' Party, Workers' Party

1998 elections in the United Kingdom
1998
June 1998 events in the United Kingdom
1998 elections in Northern Ireland